Neuse Forest is a census-designated place (CDP) in Craven County, North Carolina, United States. The population was 2,005 at the 2010 census. It is part of the New Bern, North Carolina Metropolitan Statistical Area.

Geography
Neuse Forest is located in southern Craven County at  (34.963996, -76.934159), along the south bank of the tidal Neuse River. It is bordered to the northwest by the Neuse River Recreation Area of Croatan National Forest, to the southwest by U.S. Route 70, a four-lane highway, and to the southeast by Marine Corps Air Station Cherry Point.

Demographics

2020 census

As of the 2020 United States census, there were 2,110 people, 673 households, and 494 families residing in the CDP.

2000 census
As of the census of 2000, there were 1,426 people, 526 households, and 460 families residing in the CDP. The population density was 481.1 people per square mile (186.0/km2). There were 555 housing units at an average density of 187.3 per square mile (72.4/km2). The racial makeup of the CDP was 89.97% White, 6.38% African American, 0.14% Native American, 1.75% Asian, 0.63% from other races, and 1.12% from two or more races. Hispanic or Latino of any race were 1.54% of the population.

There were 526 households, out of which 35.0% had children under the age of 18 living with them, 80.8% were married couples living together, 4.9% had a female householder with no husband present, and 12.4% were non-families. 10.1% of all households were made up of individuals, and 3.2% had someone living alone who was 65 years of age or older. The average household size was 2.71 and the average family size was 2.88.

In the CDP, the population was spread out, with 24.8% under the age of 18, 4.6% from 18 to 24, 26.9% from 25 to 44, 31.6% from 45 to 64, and 12.1% who were 65 years of age or older. The median age was 42 years. For every 100 females, there were 101.4 males. For every 100 females age 18 and over, there were 100.6 males.

The median income for a household in the CDP was $67,222, and the median income for a family was $70,284. Males had a median income of $38,889 versus $30,556 for females. The per capita income for the CDP was $29,828. None of the families and 1.1% of the population were living below the poverty line, including no under eighteens and none of those over 64.

References

Census-designated places in Craven County, North Carolina
Census-designated places in North Carolina
New Bern micropolitan area
Populated places on the Neuse River